The Advanced Radar Research Center (ARRC) is the largest academic radar program in the United States. The ARRC’s mission is to enhance safety, security, environmental quality, and economic prosperity through interdisciplinary research and the development of innovative radar solutions to a wide range of societal challenges. The ARRC has always focused on developing cutting-edge radar technology for scientific discovery and has now expanded into many more applications of radar and applied electromagnetics.  The ARRC was established in 2005 at the University of Oklahoma (OU) and is located at the Radar Innovation Lab (RIL)  in Norman, Oklahoma. The Executive Director of ARRC is Dr. Robert D. Palmer.

The ARRC has 20 faculty members, 16 full-time technical staff, and over 70 interdisciplinary graduate students.  Active areas of research include: weather/atmospheric radar, severe storms/hydrometeorology, remote sensing, defense radars/sensors, signal processing/AI/ML, spectrum sharing, applied electromagnetics/antennas, automotive radar, biomedical sensors, UAS, cUAS, rapid prototyping, and microwave/mmW components/packaging.

References

External links
 ARRC website

Radar meteorology
Norman, Oklahoma
University of Oklahoma